Smolno Małe  is a village in the administrative district of Gmina Kargowa, within Zielona Góra County, Lubusz Voivodeship, in western Poland.

The village has an approximate population of 38.

References

Villages in Zielona Góra County